The Metropolitan Borough of Dudley is a metropolitan borough of West Midlands, England. It was created in 1974 following the Local Government Act 1972, through a merger of the existing Dudley County Borough with the municipal boroughs of Stourbridge and Halesowen. 

The borough borders Sandwell to the east, the city of Birmingham to the south east, Bromsgrove to the south in Worcestershire, South Staffordshire District to the west, and the city of Wolverhampton to the north.

History

The Metropolitan Borough of Dudley was created in 1974 from the existing boroughs of Dudley, Stourbridge and Halesowen. This followed an earlier reorganisation in 1966, as per the provisions of the Local Government Act 1958, which saw an expansion of the three boroughs from the abolition of the surrounding urban districts of Amblecote, Brierley Hill, Coseley, and Sedgley; and the municipal boroughs of Tipton, Oldbury, and Rowley Regis.

Initially the borough had a two-tier system of local government, with the borough council sharing power with the West Midlands County Council. In 1986 metropolitan county councils were abolished under the Local Government Act 1985, and Dudley effectively became a unitary authority.

Government

Dudley Council has its main offices in Dudley town centre (where Dudley Council House is located), along with additional smaller offices throughout the borough. The council is made up of 72 councillors representing 24 wards.

On its formation in 1974, the Metropolitan Borough of Dudley was controlled by the Labour Party. Since then the controlling party has frequently changed, sometimes with no political party having a clear majority.

The Tories currently have control of Dudley Council as a majority run administration. After a no overall control result in the previous local elections the Tories gained control of Dudley council in the 2021 local elections.

Wards
The 24 wards of the Dudley Borough are each represented by 3 councillors:

Demography 

At the 2011 Census, the total population of the Dudley Metropolitan Borough was 312,925, an increase of 7,770 from the last census; making it the 25th largest government district in England. The population density was 31.9 people per hectare.

90.4% of Dudley's population identified as White, with 88.7% identifying as White British, 0.5% as White Irish, and 1.2% as Other White. The second largest ethnic group was Asian and British Asian, making up 5.6% of the population. Black and Black British people comprised 1.7% of the population of the borough.

Statistics on religious beliefs show that 65.3% of the population identify as Christian, with the second largest religious group being Muslim, at 4.1%. 22% identified as having no religion, while 6.2% did not state a religious belief.

Unemployment in the borough stood at 5.3%, slightly higher than the national average of 4.4%. Of those in the population considered economically active, 38.2% were in full-time employment, 15% were in part-time employment, 7.5% were self-employed, and 2.5% were in full-time education.

Of those economically inactive, 16.2% were retired, 4.6% were looking after homes or family, 4.4% were long-term sick or disabled, and 4.3% were full-time students without employment.

Economy
A part of the Black Country, Dudley traditionally has been an industrial centre of manufacturing, quarrying, and mining, although this has declined in more recent years, with a shift in focus towards the service sector (accounting for 79.1% of employment) and tourism. Despite this, there are still numerous large industrial sites around the borough, such as the Pensnett Trading Estate, with the manufacturing industries making up 15.3% of employment.

Tourism is of increasing importance to the local economy, with approximately 6,600 people employed within the sector. Attractions such as the Black Country Living Museum and Dudley Zoo bring in hundreds of thousands of visitors each year.The Merry Hill Shopping Centre in Brierley Hill is one of the largest shopping centres in the UK and is the main retail centre of the borough, with an average of 23.5 million visitors a year, and houses branches of several large retailers including Primark, Marks & Spencer, and Next.

Other large employers in the borough include JCDecaux UK, which has its Birmingham area office in Halesowen, Rentokil Initial, and Midtherm Engineering.

Tourism and visitor economy 
Dudley borough has an increasing tourism offer, with attractions such as the Black Country Geopark being recognised in 2020 and the Stourbridge Glass Museum due to open in 2022. Tourism and the visitor economy is an important sector to the borough, supporting approximately 8,000 jobs.

Many of the borough's tourist attractions draw on the industrial heritage of the area. For example, the Red House Glass Cone is an original structure from the 18th Century glass making industry in Stourbridge. The site includes designer-maker studios, galleries and hot glass studio. The Stourbridge Glass Quarter locality is also home to The Lace Guild, Glasshouse Heritage Centre and hosts the International Festival of Glass every 2 years, most recently in 2019 with the 2021 festival postponed to 2022 due to the covid-19 pandemic.  

The Caste Hill area of Dudley is also a hub of visitor attractions including the Black Country Living Museum and the Canal and Tunnel Trust. Dudley Zoological Gardens, which is also in this area, is the second most visited paid visitor attraction in the West Midlands. The Archives and Local History Centre is now also the home of the council run Dudley Museum. The museum is also the headquarters of the Black Country Geopark.

Along with sites recognised as part of the Geopark, the borough has seven nature reserves and many parks contributing to its green spaces. In 2021, the Green Flag award was obtained by seven of the boroughs sites (Buffery Park, Huntingtree Park, Mary Stevens Park, Priory Park, The Leasowes, Wrens Nest National Nature Reserve and Saltwells National Nature Reserve). Mary Stevens Park and Priory Park were also awarded Green Heritage Site status, with Abbey Road Allotments recognised with a Green Flag Community Award.

Despite not being in the bounds of Dudley borough, Himley Hall and Park is owned and run by Dudley Metropolitan Borough Council. In addition to the 180 acres of ‘Capability’ Brown landscaped parkland, the Hall has a gallery exhibition space and is a wedding venue.

Regeneration
Large public and private sector developments have taken place in the Metropolitan Borough of Dudley since its creation in 1974.

The closure of Round Oak Steelworks in December 1982 paved the way for the creation of the Merry Hill Shopping Centre on nearby farmland between 1985 and 1989. The Waterfront leisure and commercial complex was developed on the site of the steelworks itself between 1989 and 1995.

Pensnett Trading Estate in Kingswinford has been developed since the 1960s for mostly light industry and services.

A major redevelopment of Halesowen town centre took place in 2007/08, when the bus station was rebuilt and a section of the 1960s shopping area demolished to make way for a new Asda superstore.

A similar redevelopment of Stourbridge town centre in 2011/12 saw most of the Crown Centre completely rebuilt to incorporate a new Tesco superstore.

There are currently several major regeneration projects throughout the borough. Significant infrastructure projects include the new Dudley Transport Interchange and the Wednesbury to Brierley Hill West Midlands Metro extension.  The 11 km metro extension will connect Dudley, Merry Hill and Brierley Hill with the metro network and so to the proposed HS2 line. It is expected to be open to passengers in late 2023.

Regeneration projects around the Castle Hill area are combining innovation and education. The Black Country and Marches Institute of Technology opened in September 2021 and focuses delivery on higher level courses in manufacturing and engineering, medical engineering, modern construction methodologies and digital technologies. The Very Light Rail (VLR) National Innovation Centre will provide a research facility for the development of VLR technologies and projects. The centre will redevelop the former Dudley Railway Station and reconnect the town with the National Rail Network.

The DY5 Business and Innovation Enterprise Zone was launched in 2017 with the ambition to create 7,000 new jobs over 25 years. The zone is centred around the Brierley Hill area.

Work on the Dudley Townscape Heritage Programme started in 2016 following a National Lottery Heritage Fund grant of £1.2 million. Work is continuing through 2021. As part of the programme historic buildings were identified, repaired or restored. Heritage trails and open days were also developed.

Housing 
Relatively little new council housing has been built in the borough since the early 1980s, with almost all of the new social housing developments since then being built by housing associations. Most of the older private housing in the borough has been renovated rather than demolished during this time. However, there have been a number of redevelopment programmes involving 20th century council housing. In July 1999, four of the borough's tower blocks (two at Eve Hill in Dudley and two at Tanhouse in Halesowen) were demolished on consecutive weekends in controlled explosions. Two years later, two more tower blocks at Queens Cross in Dudley were demolished using the same method. Four tower blocks in Netherton are scheduled for demolition in 2017/18. In 2009, 266 homes on the predominantly 1930s Priory Estate in Dudley were demolished and the land later redeveloped with new housing. In the mid-1990s, the neighbouring Wren's Nest Estate underwent extensive refurbishment as well as improved community facilities in a multimillion-pound project funded by the European Single Budget. Four blocks of low-rise flats on the estate were demolished as part of the regeneration.

Since 2017 small developments of council housing have been built, including bungalows, housing and low-rise flats. Some properties have been designed to accommodate those with specific physical needs or those in need of supported living. The homes have been built across the borough (Brierley Hill, Coseley, Dudley, Halesowen, Kingswinford, Lower Gornal, Sedgley and Stourbridge). During this period Dudley Council have also built a number of homes for private sale.

In November 2021 Dudley Council was named homebuilder of the year (organisations with 16,000 homes or more category) at the Inside Housing UK Housing Awards.

Education

Tertiary education
There are two further education colleges in the Dudley Borough: Dudley College of Technology, Halesowen College. The borough is also home to the King Edward VI sixth form college in Stourbridge, originally a grammar school established in 1552, converting to a sixth form centre in 1976. A small number of secondary schools in the borough offer sixth form facilities, while several others did so until the beginning of the 1990s when the local authority decided to concentrate post-16 education in further education colleges.

In March 2011 Eton College and Star Academies announced their intention to open one of three sixth form colleges in Dudley, subject to funding through the Department for Education’s Free Schools Programme.

Since the University of Wolverhampton closed its Dudley campus in 2002, the metropolitan borough is the largest district in the UK without its own university. Several projects in the Castle Hill area of the Dudley are now linking with local universities. The Black Country & Marches Institute of Technology opened in September 2021, with a focus on higher level engineering courses, it partners Dudley College of Technology, University of Wolverhampton, University of Worcester, In-Comm Training Services Limited and Avensys UK Limited. A Higher Education Centre for Health & Care is proposed as a partnership between Dudley College of Technology and University of Worcester and expected to be open for Autumn 2024.

Primary and secondary education

There are 104 Dudley Council schools: 78 Primary, 40 of which include a Nursery Unit (24 Primary Academy); 19 Secondary (of which 15 are Secondary Academy Schools) and 7 Special Schools. Pupils transfer to secondary school at the age of 11, although between 1972 and 1990 pupils in the north of borough transferred to secondary school at the age of 12, and from 1972 to 1982 there was a three-tier education system in Halesowen where pupils entered first school at 5, middle school at 9 and secondary school at 13.

The borough had well over 30 secondary schools on its creation, although this was quickly reduced as a result of the introduction of the comprehensive system a year later, which resulted in a number of schools being merged or closed.

By September 1990, however, the number of secondary schools in the borough had fallen to 22 as a result of the closure of Gilbert Claughton and Mons Hill Schools and the merger of High Park and Longlands Schools in Stourbridge to form Ridgewood High. A year earlier, Castle High had been formed in the town centre of Dudley from a merger of The Dudley School and Blue Coat School; this new school also took in some of the former Gilbert Claughton and Mons Hill pupils. The 1980s had also seen the closure of some the borough's less popular and smaller primary schools, with the older buildings mostly being demolished and the more modern ones being converted for community use.

The closure of Cradley High School in Halesowen in July 2008 saw the number of secondary schools in the borough fall to 21, and the total has remained at 20 since the closure of Pensnett High School in July 2012.

When the Metropolitan Borough of Dudley was formed, many primary schools were existed as separate infant and junior or first and middle schools, but by 1990 virtually all of the separate schools had been merged to create full circle primary schools, the last separate infant and junior schools to merge being Red Hall in Lower Gornal in January 1997.

There are no grammar schools in the borough, with all state schools being comprehensive, a system which has been universal in the borough since the mid-1970s. The Former grammar schools in the borough were Dudley's Boys Grammar and Girls High Schools (merged with Park Secondary Modern School in 1975 to form The Dudley School, which in turn merged with The Blue Coat School to form Castle High in 1989), Sir Gilbert Claughton Grammar School in Dudley (which adopted comprehensive status in 1975 before closing in 1990), Brierley Hill Grammar School (actually situated in Kingswinford; it has been known as the Crestwood School since adopting comprehensive status), King Edward VI Boys Grammar School in Stourbridge (which is now a mixed sixth form college), Stourbridge Girls High School (which merged with the Boys Grammar School and Valley Road Secondary Modern School to form Redhill School), Halesowen Grammar School (which merged with Halesowen Technical School to form Earls High School) and High Arcal Grammar School in Sedgley (which survives as a comprehensive school).

The sole independent school in the borough is the Elmfield Rudolf Steiner School in Stourbridge, which follows the Steiner Waldorf curriculum.

The Old Swinford Hospital school in Stourbridge is one of only 34 state-funded boarding schools in England, with education being funded by the local education authority (LEA).

Healthcare
The main NHS hospital serving the borough is Russells Hall Hospital, situated to the south of Dudley town centre. Following a major expansion of the hospital in 2005, all inpatient services were transferred to the site from smaller hospitals around the borough, resulting in the closure of Wordsley Hospital, and the downgrading of the Guest Hospital and Corbett hospitals into outpatient centres.

Psychiatric care is offered at the Bushey Fields Hospital, located adjacent to Russells Hall Hospital.

See also Healthcare in West Midlands.

Localities

See List of areas in Dudley

Freedom of the Borough
The following people, military units and Organisations and Groups have received the Freedom of the Borough of Dudley. The Roll of Freeman is displayed in the Council House on wood panelling at the entrance to the Council Chamber.

Individuals
 William Humble, Earl of Dudley: 10 January 1899
 Brooke Robinson: 11 September 1906
 Alderman Sir Gilbert Henry Claughton, Baronet: 9 November 1912
 Edwin John Thompson: 24 November 1936
 Alderman John Harry Molyneux OBE JP: 24 February 1959
 Alderman John Collcott Price JP: 23 April 1963
 Alderman Harry Clifford Whitehouse OBE JP: 23 April 1963
 Percy Dale Wadsworth: 25 April 1973
 Bert Bissell MBE: 19 February 1981
 William Eley Homer: 9 March 1989
 John Thomas Wilson: 9 March 1989
 John James Curley: 23 January 1992
 Frederick Stuart Hunt: 18 May 2000
 Sir Lenny Henry : 25 February 2013.
 David Murray Caunt MBE: 13 July 2015
 David Sparks OBE: 13 July 2015
 Jordanne Whiley : 30 November 2015.
 Roy Richardson: 4 December 2017
 Hilary Bills: 20 May 2021
 Les Jones: 20 May 2021
 Ian Marshall Kettle: 20 May 2021

Military Units
 The Worcestershire Regiment: 8 April 1961
 The Staffordshire Regiment (The Prince of Wales's): 29 April 1967
 The Mercian Regiment: 15 October 2007
 The Royal Mercian and Lancastrian Yeomanry: 22 February 2010
 Royal Mercian and Lancastrian Yeomanry (TA): 30 June 2012
 RAF Cosford: 4 December 2017
 63  Company, 6 Battalion Military Intelligence Company Intelligence Corps: 18 February 2019.

Organisations and Groups  
 National Health Service, Public Health, Adult Services, Children's Services, Bereavement Services and Care Sector Workers: 23 July 2020

See also

Evolution of Worcestershire county boundaries
South Staffordshire Line

References

External links
 Dudley Borough Wards

 
Metropolitan boroughs of the West Midlands (county)
NUTS 3 statistical regions of the United Kingdom
Black Country Local Enterprise Partnership